Rafael Antonio Acevedo Porras (born 4 May 1957) is a Colombian former professional road cyclist.

Major results

1979
 1st Stage 9 Vuelta a Colombia
1980
 4th Overall Vuelta a Colombia
1st Stage 2
1981
 1st Stages 6 & 12 Vuelta a Colombia
 9th Overall Tour de l'Avenir
1982
 2nd Overall Vuelta a Colombia
1st Stage 7
 4th Overall Tour de l'Avenir
1st  Mountains classification
1984
 10th Overall Vuelta a Colombia
 10th Overall Clásico RCN
1986
 1st Overall Vuelta a Costa
1988
 1st Clásico Centenario de Armenia

Grand Tour general classification results timeline

References

External links

1954 births
Living people
Colombian male cyclists
Vuelta a Colombia stage winners
People from Sogamoso
Sportspeople from Boyacá Department
20th-century Colombian people